Daytime Friends – The Very Best of Kenny Rogers is a 1993 compilation album by country superstar Kenny Rogers.

Overview
This album has remained in print longer than Rogers other collections The Kenny Rogers Singles Album and The Kenny Rogers Story, the latter of which has the same quantity of tracks, but differs somewhat in track listing. The album peaked at #5 on the UK sales charts upon re-entry in 2005.

Track listing

Certifications

References

1993 compilation albums
Kenny Rogers compilation albums